Naheed is a given name. Notable people with the name include:

Naheed Abidi, Indian scholar of Sanskrit and writer
Naheed Akhtar, Pakistani playback singer
Kishwar Naheed (born 1940), feminist Urdu poet from Pakistan
Naheed Nenshi (born 1972), Canadian politician and 36th mayor of Calgary, Alberta
Naheed Nusrat (1948–1997), Pakistani musician, primarily a singer of Qawwali, the devotional music of the Sufis
Naheed Qasimi, Pakistani writer and literary critic
Naheed Shabbir, Pakistani television actress and model

See also
Azra Naheed Medical College, private college of medicine, pharmacy and physiotherapy located on Raiwind Road, Lahore, Punjab, Pakistan
Nasheed